John Garibaldi "Podge" Weihe (November 13, 1862 – April 15, 1914) was a Major League Baseball outfielder who played for two seasons. He played for the Cincinnati Red Stockings for one game in 1883 and the Indianapolis Hoosiers for 63 games during their only year of existence in 1884.

External links

1862 births
1914 deaths
Cincinnati Red Stockings (AA) players
Indianapolis Hoosiers (AA) players
Major League Baseball outfielders
Baseball players from Ohio
19th-century baseball players
Columbus Stars (baseball) players
Minneapolis Millers (baseball) players
Lima Lushers players
Hamilton (minor league baseball) players